Alfred James Elliott (June 1, 1895 – January 17, 1973) was an American politician who served six terms as a Democratic Representative from California from 1937 to 1949.

Early life and career 
He was born in Guinda, California, and moved with his parents to Winters, California, in 1901, and to Tulare, California, in 1910, where he resided until his death in 1973. He worked as a farmer and livestock breeder and was the owner and publisher of the Tulare Daily News. From 1933 to 1937, he served as the chairman of the Tulare County Board of Supervisors. From 1935 to 1936, he was a member of the California Supervisor Association of the State welfare board and in 1936 he served on the California State Safety Council.

Congress 
He was first elected to the United States House of Representatives in 1937, by special election to fill the vacancy caused by the death of Henry E. Stubbs. He was re-elected to represent California's 10th congressional district five times and served from 1937 to 1949. He retired in 1965.

Elliot was among the most outspoken in expressing bigotry toward Japanese Americans. In 1943 he protested the release of some Japanese Americans from the relocation camps, repeating his earlier statement that "the only good Jap is a dead Jap," and declaring that "When the war is over, as far as I am concerned, we should ship every Jap in the United States back to Japan . . ."

Death
Elliot died on January 17, 1973, in Tulare, California at the age of 77.

References

Congressional Biographical Directory: Alfred James Elliott - From the Biographical Directory of the United States Congress.

Democratic Party members of the United States House of Representatives from California
1895 births
1973 deaths
20th-century American politicians
People from Yolo County, California
People from Winters, California
People from Tulare, California